Rugginenti is an Italian surname prevalent in Milan and Lodi, Lombardy. This surname is probably derived from the Gallo Italic word Rugginent or Rüsnent (rust) which was used to refer to people with red hair. The surname first appeared in Lombardy at the end of the 1700s.

References

Italian-language surnames